A preschool teacher is a person who is employed to care for children from infant to 4 years of age in a daytime setting. “Preschool“ is the category for children aged 2 to 4 years of age. (Infants: 0-1 year of age & Toddlers: 1–2 years of age).

A preschool teacher provides care to children aged 2–4 years old within unlicensed childcare centres, licensed childcare centres, home based child care and after school programs. (*See the definition for “Childcare” on Wikipedia for further insight and understanding.) Attendance for children in Preschool is not mandated as it is not a publicly funded educational program accessible to all. There are costs involved and usually sought after by working parents until the child reaches school age.

Some jurisdictions have implemented an Act aimed towards regulating childcare and bring cohesiveness to the field of childcare. Legislation provides a framework for the regulation of child care programs, including training requirements for staff, health and safety standards, staff-child ratios, space requirements, nutritional standards, and access to outdoors.

Preschool teachers ensure the safety of the children in their care while creating a nurturing setting for children to develop their cognitive, social and emotional skills. Childcare settings also provide routines and structure in preparation for children’s future academic success once children age out of day-time child care and enters the elementary education system, either publicly funded or private system. system. “Preschool teachers” are also employed to care for children ages 5–12 years in an after school care setting.

Licensing and qualifications for “preschool teachers” vary based on regions/countries. It is recommended (but not mandated) for “preschool teachers” to have post-secondary education (preferably in early years development). Some programs are accredited from a regulated and approved Institution while others are from private sector educational institutions.

As the field of Child Care is evolving, it is recommended to check the legislation in your area for accurate and up-to-date information on policies, regulations and qualification requirements.

Dependant upon the legislation in geographical areas, preschool teachers may require a license from their regulatory body the form of a Child Development Accreditation (CDA) or formal college education in early childhood or a related subject.

The term "preschool" refers to instruction in non-public arenas such as licensed preschools, childcare centers, family day care centers, home day care centers, center-based programs, federal programs like Head Start, and full or part-day private child centers or day care centers sponsored by religious bodies.

Preschool teachers must be able to work well and interact with young children, sometimes as young as 2 years 9 months. Preschool children have a short attention span and their worries are usually fairly simple. Most preschoolers are loving, affectionate, and playful, and like to play games, be read to, or play with toys. Therefore the Diploma programs provide an introduction into the stages of development and offers those who study this program insight into whether children are adequately developing as expected but do not provide qualifications for diagnosing children who are deemed exceptional.

See also
 Early childhood education

References

Education and training occupations
Early childhood education
People who work with children